Ukrnafta is a Ukrainian oil and natural gas extracting company, the largest producer of oil and gas in the country. Ukrnafta is also an operator of a gas filling station network in Ukraine nationwide.

In 2006, the company conducted some 91% of oil, 27% of natural-gas condensate and 17% of gas extraction in the country. As of 2020, the company produced around 1.5 million tonnes of oil, 1.13 billion m3 of natural gas and 117 thousands tonnes of LPG.

Background
The company was established in 1994 through privatization of the "Ukrnafta producing association" state enterprise that existed since 1945. Its initial predecessor was Ukrnaftcombinat. Ukrnafta is a Ukrainian portmanteau word that is a combination of the words for "Ukrainian" and "oil".

Just over 50% plus one share of the company is owned by the state company Naftogaz Ukrainy, 42% of the company belongs to the Privat Group based in Dnipro. Together with Chornomornaftogaz and Ukragazproduction they are the only state companies involved in extraction and refining of gas and oil.

After the appointment of Mark Rollins (ex BP and BG Gas) as CEO in 2015 the company is widely considered as having transformed itself into a leading model of corporate governance in the new economy of Ukraine.

Starting from 1 May 2019  Oleg Gez as acting Ukrnafta CEO.

Ukrnafta had 85 permits for hydrocarbons extraction (commercial development of reserves). As of year-end 2020, Ukrnafta had 1 813 oil wells and 155 gas wells in operation, including main and joint activity.

Structure
Ukrnafta Public Joint Stock Company operates as a single production and economic complex.

The Company consists of:

 six oil and gas production departments: Okhtyrka, Chernihiv, Poltava, Dolyna, Nadvirna, Boryslav;
 three drilling departments;
 one oil refinery;
 3 gas processing factories:
Hnidyn (Varva, Chernihiv Oblast)
Kachanivka (Mala Pavlivka, Sumy Oblast)
Dolyna (Dolyna, Ivano-Frankivsk Oblast)
two grouting controls;
two central bases of production service;
Poltava paramilitary unit for the prevention and elimination of open oil and gas fountains;
management of automated systems;
installation and adjustment management;
Research and Design Institute;
Center for Regulatory and Economic Research;
Center for Geological and Thematic Research;
Representation of the Company in the Russian Federation, the Middle East and North Africa.

Gas filling stations

The company has one of the biggest networks of gas filling stations owning 537 stations on 31 December 2014.

There 28 regional administrations to provide more efficient management of the stations.

Educational centers 
The main educational institutions and centers where training was conducted are:

 Ivano-Frankivsk National Technical University of Oil and Gas;
 Drohobych Petroleum Technical School;
 Paton Institute of Electric Welding;
 Lviv Interdisciplinary Institute for Advanced Training.
On the management of PJSC "Ukrnafta" there are four children's health camps and sanatoriums in different regions of Ukraine. There is a medical unit with a hospital in Dolyna, where oil workers and members of their families are treated.

Supervisory board
This is the schematic composition of the directive table of the company:
 Andriy Kobolyev
 Chairman of the Supervisory Board
 Sergiy Konovets
 Yuriy Vitrenko
 Kostyantyn Pozhydayev
 Yaroslav Teklyuk
 Polina Zagnitko
 Volodymyr Yemtsev
 Maxsym Yuhymenko
 Vladislav Lazorenko

Other areas
The company distributes its oil products through some 531 petrol stations.

Seizure by Ukrainian government 
On November 6th, 2022 the government led by President Volodymyr Zelenskiy used martial law to seize control of the company. “Such steps, which are necessary for our country in conditions of war, are carried out in accordance with current laws and will help meet the urgent needs of our defense sector.” The government of Ukraine also took control of engine maker Motor Sich, energy company Ukrtatnafta, vehicle maker AvtoKrAZ and transformer maker Zaporizhtransformator at the same time.

Just prior to the seizure, Naftogaz owned 50% +1 share, other shares were held:
 13.6% Little Enterprises Limited
 13.6% Bridgemont Ventures Limited 
 12.9% Bordo Management Limited 

Ihor Kolomoiskyi and Gennadiy Bogolyubov owned 42% of the shares in Ukrnafta. These shares will be transferred to a special depository account managed by the Ministry of Defense of Ukraine.

Suspected criminal activity 
In September 2022, the National Anti-Corruption Bureau informed officials of Ukrnafta and directors of several enterprises about the suspicion of embezzlement of company property and funds worth 13.3 billion hryvnias

On 1 February 2023 the Economic Security Bureau of Ukraine announced that it had exposed an alleged $1 billion embezzlement scheme affecting Ukrtatnafta and Ukrnafta. The misappropriated UAH40 billion is claimed to involve the former management of Ukrnafta and Ukrtatnafta. The illegal schemes involved tax evasion and money laundering. Searches included properties of Ihor Kolomoiskyi.

See also

References

External links
 

 
Oil companies of Ukraine
Privat Group
Ukrainian companies established in 1994
State companies of Ukraine
Companies based in Kyiv
Privately held companies in Ukraine
Economy of Kyiv
Convenience stores of Ukraine
Filling stations in Ukraine